Pisarenko is a Ukrainian surname. It is a patronymic surname derived from the father's nickname or surname 'Pisar', meaning "scribe".  Notable people with this surname include:

Anatoly Pisarenko (born 1958), Ukrainian weightlifter
Pavel Pisarenko, Russian football player
Vitaly Pisarenko (born 1987), Ukrainian pianist
Vladilen Fedorovich Pisarenko, the author of Pisarenko harmonic decomposition, a method of frequency estimation

See also
 

Ukrainian-language surnames
Patronymic surnames